Conflicts that took place in Belgrade is a timeline of events that includes wars, battles, skirmishes, major riots and other related items that have occurred on the territory of today's city of Belgrade and resulted in large loss of life or large social political changes

21st century
No wars.

20th century
 5 October 2000 Overthrow of Slobodan Milošević
 1999 NATO bombing of Yugoslavia
 1991 1991 protests in Belgrade
 1944 Belgrade Offensive
 6–7/8 April 1941 Operation Retribution (1941)
 27 March 1941 Yugoslav coup d'état
 1 November 1918 Serbian Campaign of World War I -  The Serbs, with help of allies, recapture Belgrade
 6–9 October 1915: German and Austrian troops capture Belgrade
 15 December 1914 The Serbs recapture Belgrade
 2 December 1914 Austrians bombard and capture Belgrade

19th century

18th century
 15 September – 8 October 1789 Siege of Belgrade (1789)
 1739 Capture of Belgrade (1739)
 July 22, 1739 Battle of Grocka
 July 16, 1717 – August 17, 1717 Siege of Belgrade (1717)

17th century
 1690 Siege of Belgrade (1690)
 30 July 1688 - 6 September 1688 Siege of Belgrade (1688)

16th century
 25 June - 29 August 1521 Siege of Belgrade (1521)

15th century
 July 4–22, 1456 Siege of Belgrade (1456)

BC
 34–33 BC the Roman army came to Belgrade and renamed it to Singidunum
 279 BC Celts conquered the city and named it Singidun

History of Belgrade